This is a list of the most-played video games ordered by their estimated player count, which include downloads, registered accounts, video game subscription services, and/or monthly active users. This list does not include games with official sales figures; those are located at the list of best-selling video games page instead. This list is also not comprehensive, because player counts are not always publicly available, reliable, or up-to-date.

The list does not include mobile games, unless versions of the game have also been released on non-mobile platforms. For a separate list of mobile titles, see the list of most-played mobile games by player count. Three of the top five most-played video games on this list are published by Tencent.

List

See also 
 Lists of video games
 List of most-played mobile games by player count

Notes

References 

Entertainment-related lists of superlatives
Lists of video games